Benjamin Forster may refer to:

Benjamin Förster (born 1989), German footballer
Benjamin Meggot Forster (1764–1829), English botanist and mycologist
Benjamin Forster (antiquary) (1736–1805), English antiquary
Ben Forster (actor) (born 1981), English actor

See also
Benjamin Forstner (1834–1897), American gunsmith, inventor, and dry goods merchant
Ben Foster (disambiguation)